This is a list of all the United States Supreme Court cases from volume 444 of the United States Reports:

External links

1979 in United States case law
1980 in United States case law